Sanchaung Township is in the north central part of Yangon. The township comprises 18 wards, and shares borders with Kamayut Township in the north, Kamayut township and Bahan Township in the east, Kyimyindaing Township in the west, and Dagon Township and Ahlon Township in the south. The township has 19 primary schools, two middle schools and four high schools. Dagon Center I and II are shopping malls inside the township, where there are many restaurants, fashion shops, and Mingalar Cinema. Other recreational spaces include Happy World recreation center and People's Park.

Landmarks
The following is a list of landmarks protected by the city in Sanchaung township.

References

Townships of Yangon